Evoland is a 2013 role-playing video game developed and published by Shiro Games. Evoland was first released for Microsoft Windows and OS X in April 2013, Android and iOS in February 2015 and Linux in March 2015.

The design retraces the history of video games. Inspired by The Legend of Zelda, Diablo and Final Fantasy gameplay, the game has many references to movies and video game history.  As the player progresses, they unlock new technologies and graphical upgrades that nod towards different eras of the video game industry.

A sequel, Evoland 2, was announced at the end of 2014 and was released August 25, 2015. The two games were packaged together as Evoland: Legendary Edition and released for home consoles in February 2019.

Gameplay 
Evoland is based on the concept of tracing the evolution of video games.  When the game begins, there are only four colors, simple pixelated graphics, and a 2D character. Through the adventure, the player gradually unlocks new graphics, new technologies and new gameplay until reaching the HD age and a three-dimensional world. This evolution in-game of video game history is punctuated by many references to classic role-playing games and movies.

The game alternates between action RPG phases similar to The Legend of Zelda and Active-Time Battles like those seen in Final Fantasy. The character moves in a world made up of dungeons, caverns, forests and villages full of NPCs. Players collect the in-game currency Glis after each battle, which can be spent in towns to purchase additional items and upgrades, many of which must be obtained to finish the game. In addition to completing the story mode, players can also attempt to find hidden stars and cards that are scattered around the game world, the latter of which can be used in a collectible card game based on "Triple Triad" from Final Fantasy VIII.

Development 
Originally, Evoland was a video game created by Nicolas Cannasse during the 24th Ludum Dare, an "accelerated video game competition". Participants have 48 hours to create a video game respecting a given theme. The 24th Ludum Dare theme was "Evolution". Nicolas Cannasse proposed Evoland in about 30 hours and won first place out of 1400 participants. The concept he proposed can be defined as a game which changes as the player follows the history of RPGs.

The player feedback was very encouraging. Evoland Classic quickly reached over 300,000 players within a couple of months, and is still playable on the Evoland Website for free. Also, as common in Ludum Dare, the Haxe source code was made available, in this case on GitHub.

Given the success of Evoland Classic, Shiro Games decided to create a new version of the game with new bosses and monsters, new play styles, full environment 3D and an extended play-time.

Release 

Evoland was first released on Steam and GOG.com at $9.99 on April 4, 2013. In February 2015, the game was ported by Playdigious on iOS App Store and Google Play for $4.99. On January 24, 2019, Shiro Games announced that Evoland and Evoland 2 would be packaged together in a single release, titled Evoland: Legendary Edition, and released for PlayStation 4, Xbox One, Nintendo Switch and PC the following February.

Reception 

The game was received by critics with an average rating of 61 out of 100 on Metacritic. Specialized press and websites acclaimed the potential and originality of the concept as well as the references to cinema and video games history.

According to Destructoid "Evoland'''s elements form a love letter to some of the most venerated games in their respective genres, and it's surprising just how well the shifting gameplay types work together." Many critics comment on how nostalgia helps make the game excel.

Main criticisms concerned the play-time and the lack of variety. Some players and specialized websites criticized the fact that the game stops evolving much after 30 minutes.Evoland'' reached approximately 460,000 sales on Steam alone according to Steam Spy.

References

External links 
 
 Evoland Classic
 Shiro Games official website

Action-adventure games
Role-playing video games
IOS games
Android (operating system) games
Windows games
MacOS games
Linux games
Parody video games
PlayStation 4 games
Nintendo Switch games
Retro-style video games
Xbox One games
2013 video games
Video games developed in France
Single-player video games
Playdigious games